St. Francis Xavier Cathedral is a Roman Catholic cathedral in Grodno, Belarus. Originally a Jesuit church, it became a cathedral in 1991, when the new diocese of Grodno was erected. Nowadays it is one of only three minor basilicas in Belarus.

History

Construction 
The construction of the church started in 1687, when the city was part of the Polish-Lithuanian Commonwealth. The completed building in Baroque style became one of the most important baroque basilica in Europe.

In the XII-XIV centuries a pendulum clock was installed in one of the towers. Nowadays it is one of the oldest active clocks in Europe.

The cathedral was consecrated in 1705 to St. Francis Xavier by bishop Teodor Potocki. The ceremony was attended by the Russian Emperor Peter the Great and the King of Poland Augustus II the Strong. Sixty meters in length and thirty meters wide, it became one of the largest in Europe. During the XVIII century the Jesuits were decorating the cathedral with frescoes, ordered altars and baroque domes. The retable (lat. 'retabulum') got more than 70 sculptures of high artistic value, 20 on the first level, 15 on the second, and 14 on the third. Among them there are four female figures as personification of the continents, two lions, 14 angels, etc.

The monastery was dissolved in 1773 and the church became a parish one.

XX – XXI centuries 
The church survived World War II with no serious damage.

In 1960 it was officially closed for public religious services (for 27 years). The Soviet authorities tried to convert the building into a museum or a concert hall. Despite this, people attended the church every Sunday for a common prayer, songs and rosary. The religious services were restored in 1987. In 1990 the church was granted the title of minor basilica, and a year later it became a cathedral for a diocese of Grodno.

See also
 List of Jesuit sites

References

Sources 
 А.А. Ярашэвіч, В.Дз. Бажэнава. Гродзенскі кафедральны касцёл святога Францыска Ксаверыя – Мінск: Беларусь, 2005. (In Belarusian)

External links 
 History of S. Francis Xavier Cathedral in Grodno (text in Polish)
 Cathedral of Grodno - Photos on Radzima.org website

1687 establishments
Roman Catholic cathedrals in Belarus
Churches in Grodno
Baroque church buildings in Belarus
Articles containing video clips